Sturk's Tobacconists is a tobacconist based in Greenmarket Square, Cape Town, South Africa. Founded on 1 August 1793 is notable for being the oldest tobacconist and possibly oldest business in South Africa. Its physical location closed down due to the COVID-19 pandemic and resulting tobacco sales ban during the pandemic lockdown period.

References

1793 establishments in the Cape Colony
Companies based in Cape Town
Tobacconists
Retail companies of South Africa